The 42nd Street station was a local station on the demolished IRT Ninth Avenue Line in Manhattan, New York City. It was opened on November 6, 1875, and had two levels. On the lower level, the local trains stopped, on two tracks serving two side platforms. The upper level was built as part of the Dual Contracts and had one track which carried express trains bypassing the station. The next northbound stop was 50th Street. The next southbound stop was 34th Street. The station was closed on June 11, 1940.

References

External links 
NYCsubway.org - The IRT Ninth Avenue Elevated Line-Polo Grounds Shuttle

IRT Ninth Avenue Line stations
Railway stations in the United States opened in 1875
Railway stations closed in 1940
Former elevated and subway stations in Manhattan
1875 establishments in New York (state)
1940 disestablishments in New York (state)